Elsey is a national park in the Northern Territory of Australia, extending from 2 km to 19 km east of Mataranka and 378 km southeast of Darwin.

Features of the park include Mataranka Falls, and the “Mataranka Thermal Pools”

The thermal springs are home to a well known colony of the little red fruit-bat, species Pteropus scapulatus, an attraction that has also been discouraged from inhabiting the site for the strong odour of their camps. These fruit eating bats roost during the day at the stands of bamboo, often in large numbers, and leave at night to feed on nectar from trees.

See also 
 Protected areas of the Northern Territory

References

External links 
 Official fact sheet and map

National parks of the Northern Territory
Protected areas established in 1991
1991 establishments in Australia